The Jeof Candiana (named for the town of its  origin) is an Italian homebuilt aircraft that was designed and produced by Jeof srl of Candiana, introduced in the mid-1990s. When it was available the aircraft was supplied as a kit for amateur construction.

Design and development
The Candiana features a strut-braced high-wing, a two-seats-in-side-by-side configuration enclosed cabin accessed via doors, fixed conventional landing gear and a single engine in tractor configuration. Tricycle landing gear  is optional.

The aircraft is made from a combination of welded steel tubing and aluminum. The aircraft was designed as a testbed for the Sax 86 engine, a derivative of the Fiat Fire four-cylinder four-stroke automotive powerplant.

Operational history
By 1998 the company reported that ten kits had been sold, were completed and flying.

Specifications (Candiana)

References

External links
Photo of a Jeof Candiana

Candiana
1990s Italian sport aircraft
1990s Italian ultralight aircraft
1990s Italian civil utility aircraft
Single-engined tractor aircraft
High-wing aircraft
Homebuilt aircraft